Syntrophomonas sapovorans is a bacterium. It is anaerobic, syntrophic, and fatty acid-oxidizing and obligately proton-reducing. Its type strain is OM. It has a doubling time of 40 hours. It is part of the family Syntrophomonadaceae based on comparative small-subunit (SSU) rRNA sequence analysis. This family currently contains three genera, Syntrophomonas, Syntrophospora, and Thermosyntropha, as well as two closely related isolates, strains FSM2 and FSS7.

References

Further reading

External links 
 
 LPSN
 Type strain of Syntrophomonas sapovorans at BacDive -  the Bacterial Diversity Metadatabase

Eubacteriales
Gram-positive bacteria
Bacteria described in 1987